Lasker is a surname. Notable people with the surname include:

 Albert Lasker (1880–1952), advertising pioneer; husband of Mary Woodward Lasker
 Berthold Lasker, German chess master; brother of Emanuel Lasker
 Eduard Lasker (1829–1884), German politician
 Edward Lasker (1885–1981), leading American chess and Go player
 Edward Lasker (businessman) (1912-1997), American businessman, son of ad executive Albert Lasker
 Emanuel Lasker (1868–1941), German chess player, chess world champion, and mathematician; brother of Berthold Lasker
 Gabriel Lasker (1912–2002), American anthropologist
 Jonathan Lasker (born 1948), American artist
 Lawrence Lasker (born 1949), American screenwriter and producer
 Mary Woodward Lasker, health activist; wife of Albert Lasker

See also
 Else Lasker-Schüler (1869–1945), German Jewish poet

German-language surnames
Jewish surnames